"Recess" is a song by American record producers Skrillex and Kill the Noise, featuring vocals from Fatman Scoop and Passion Pit frontman Michael Angelakos. It was released on March 14, 2014, as part of Skrillex's debut studio album Recess (2014). It entered the UK Singles Chart at number 57 after being added to BBC Radio 1's rotation. On May 15, 2014, the song was confirmed as the album's second single. Soon after, a teaser video for the single was released on Skrillex's YouTube channel on July 3, 2014. The song was released as a single on July 7, 2014, alongside remixes from Flux Pavilion, Milo and Otis, Valentino Khan and Ape Drums.

Formats and track listings

Credits and personnel
 Sonny "Skrillex" Moore – production
 Jake "Kill the Noise" Stanczak – production
 Isaac "Fatman Scoop" Freeman – vocals
 Michael Angelakos – vocals

Charts

Weekly charts

Year-end charts

References

2014 singles
2014 songs
Skrillex songs
Atlantic Records singles
Asylum Records singles
Song recordings produced by Skrillex
Fatman Scoop songs
Moombahton songs
Songs written by Skrillex
Kill the Noise songs
Songs written by Michael Angelakos
Songs written by Fatman Scoop